One Last Laugh in a Place of Dying... is the second and final album by The God Machine. It was released on CD and LP in 1994 by Fiction Records/Polydor. The band had already ceased to function by the time of the album's release due to the sudden death of bassist Jimmy Fernandez earlier in the year.

Critical reception 

In 2005, One Last Laugh in a Place of Dying... was ranked number 353 in Rock Hard magazine's book The 500 Greatest Rock & Metal Albums of All Time.

Track listing

References 

1994 albums
The God Machine (band) albums
Fiction Records albums